The 2017–18 Professional U23 Development League was the sixth season of the Professional Development League system.

Premier League 2

Division 1

Table

Results

Division 2

Table

Results

Play-offs

See also
 2017–18 Professional U18 Development League
 2017–18 Premier League Cup
 2017–18 in English football

References

2017–18 in English football leagues
2017-18